Mogwai are a Scottish post-rock band.

Mogwai may also refer to:

Mogwai (Chinese culture), a demon in Chinese tradition
Mogwai, a species of fictional creature (based on the Chinese demon) in the film Gremlins and Gremlins 2: The New Batch

See also
Moguai, a German DJ and music producer
Chab, a Swiss progressive house producer who releases under the name Moogwai